The Beloved Game (Swedish: Den kara leken) is a 1959 Swedish comedy film directed by Kenne Fant and starring Bibi Andersson, Sven Lindberg and Lars Ekborg. The film's sets were designed by the art director Bibi Lindström.

Cast
 Bibi Andersson as Lena
 Sven Lindberg as Sven
 Lars Ekborg as 	Pelle
 Sigge Fürst as 	Adolf Grusande
 Sif Ruud as 	Telephone operator

References

Bibliography 
 Qvist, Per Olov & von Bagh, Peter. Guide to the Cinema of Sweden and Finland. Greenwood Publishing Group, 2000.

External links 
 

1959 films
Swedish comedy films
1959 comedy films
1950s Swedish-language films
Films directed by Kenne Fant
1950s Swedish films

sv:Den kära leken